The Corsham Limestone Formation is a geological formation in England. It is part of the Great Oolite Group and was deposited in the Bathonian stage of the Middle Jurassic. It is found in the central to southern regions of the Cotswolds

References

Jurassic England
Rock formations of England
Geologic formations of the United Kingdom
Jurassic System of Europe
Bathonian Stage